The Jupiter Hotel is a converted, mid-20th century motor inn boutique hotel located in Portland, Oregon, in the United States. It has been described as a "party hotel" and has been compared to the Standard Hotels in Los Angeles.

History
The hotel was once a two-story 1960s motor lodge motel. After major renovations, it reopened as the Jupiter Hotel in October 2004. During its renovation, the old motel's parking lot was transformed into a courtyard and the entire building was painted white. All rooms were completely renovated, along with the addition of the DreamSUITE and three event spaces: the DreamBOX, ThinkTANK and DreamTENT. 

The hotel is part of a larger effort to "revive" the area surrounding Burnside Avenue east of the Willamette River.

Description

The hotel complex consists of white, two-story buildings that surround a central courtyard containing plastic chairs where guests can congregate. Its 81 rooms contain items such as iPod docking stations, shag pillows, and chalkboard doors. Additionally, the rooms also have blue wall panels with photo murals on the walls. Most of the hotel's rooms have platform beds. It is home to the Doug Fir Lounge, one of Portland's most popular music venues. The hotel also has a hair salon and a tattoo parlor.

Reception
In recent years, the Jupiter Hotel has gained recognition for being a "hip" spot in Portland. Willamette Week readers ranked Jupiter Hotel first place in the "Best Hotel" category in 2006. The hotel has also earned a reputation for being gay-friendly.

References

External links

 

2004 establishments in Oregon
Buckman, Portland, Oregon
Hotels in Portland, Oregon